Maritimein is an aurone, a type of natural phenol. It is the 6-glucoside of maritimetin. It can be found in Coreopsis maritima. It is an anthochlor pigment, a kind of yellow pigment.

References

Flavonoid glucosides
Aurones